Sigma Pi is one of the four male literary societies of Illinois College.  It is the oldest literary society at Illinois College and one of the oldest literary societies in the United States, having been founded on Saturday, June 24, 1843.  Sigma Pi resides in Beecher Hall, the oldest college building in Illinois. William Jennings Bryan, a three time presidential nominee, is one of its most distinguished members.

Origin

"To Samuel Willard and Henry Wing, the idea first occurred of founding a society which would live while their Alma Mater sat in proud eminence. Accordingly, on Saturday, June 24th, 1843 the first regular meeting of the Sigma Pi Society was held in room 32, Old College Building." Thus was born the first permanent literary society at Illinois College.

Sigma Pi was nameless until Barbour Lewis suggested the appropriateness of keeping "Union and Progress" and Samuel Willard selected the corresponding Greek Words, Sustasis Kai Prokape along with Henry Wing's suggestion that Sigma Pi adopt the Hebrew sentence from the history of Creation, from Genesis "let there be light".

The fourteen founders of Sigma Pi are:
Samuel Willard
Thomas K. Beecher
Charles H. Tillson
William E. Catlin
William Ireland
Newton Bateman
Henry Wing
Henry M. Lyons
Barbour Lewis
George W. Harlan
William C. Goudy
John B. Shaw
Joseph L. Thayer (died August 25, 1843)
John Tillson

Purpose

The purpose of Sigma Pi Literary Society is concisely stated in its constitution. "The purpose of the society shall be the attainment of truth, and the advancement of its members in literary and scientific pursuits." The society also strives to develop the social, communication, and leadership skills of the membership.

Operations
Sigma Pi hosts a number of literary functions throughout the year. It assembles three literary productions a semester, while still providing community service and a strong bond of brotherhood within its members. Each semester, three judged Literary Productions are held. These judged meetings consist of pieces given by society members to an audience. Sigma Pi conducts weekly business meetings, which are conducted using Robert's Rules of Order.  These meetings are intended to direct the everyday operations of Sigma Pi.

References

Student societies in the United States
Illinois College
College literary societies in the United States